Quarterdeck can refer to:
 Quarterdeck, part of a warship
 Quarterdeck Office Systems
 Quarterdeck Expanded Memory Manager
 Quarterdeck Mosaic
 Quarterdeck DESQview/X 2.0
 Quarterdeck Cleansweep
 Quarterdeck Investment Partners, Inc.
 Quarterdeck Ridge